The Autonomist Republican Union Party (PURA) was a Spanish republican party based in Valencia and founded in 1908 by Vicente Blasco Ibáñez.

References

Defunct political parties in Spain
Political parties established in 1907
Political parties disestablished in 1936
Republican parties in Spain
Restoration (Spain)
1907 establishments in Spain
1936 disestablishments in Spain